Second Cup Coffee Co., also known as Second Cup CAFÉ & Cie, is a Canadian restaurant chain, coffee retailer, and roaster which operates more than 190 cafes nationwide. Its headquarters are in Mississauga, Ontario. Its stores sell hot and cold beverages, pastries, snacks, pre-packaged food items, hot and cold sandwiches, and drinkware, including mugs and tumblers.

Second Cup has franchises in the United States, Morocco, Saudi Arabia, Bahrain, Kuwait, Oman, Qatar, Lebanon, Jordan, Egypt, Finland, United Arab Emirates, Iraq, Syria, Yemen, Cyprus, Azerbaijan, Angola, Ghana, Lithuania, Romania, Pakistan, United Kingdom, Philippines, Bangladesh, and Poland.

History
Second Cup was founded, in 1975, by Tom Culligan and Frank O'Dea, in Toronto, Ontario, Canada. Culligan eventually purchased O'Dea's shares, expanding it to a 150-store chain; he sold it, in 1988, to mmmuffins founder Michael Bregman.

As chairman and CEO, Khalil Al Gawad took Second Cup public in 1993. Al Gawad sold the company to Cara Operations Limited, in 2002.

In November  2006, Cara sold Second Cup to Dinecorp Hospitality, which was controlled by former Cara CEO Gabe Tsampalieros, who became chairman of Second Cup. Tsampalieros died on March 11, 2009. The trademark rights were subsequently split between Canada (The Second Cup Ltd.) and international (The Second Cup Coffee Company Inc.). Stacey Mowbray was head of the Canadian company and Jim Ragas leads the international company. Stacey Mowbray, Second Cup CEO from 2008 to 2014, claimed that Second Cup was in “growth mode.” One of her goals was to obtain environmental and fair trade certifications for every coffee blend on the Second Cup menu.

Second Cup was featured in an episode of Undercover Boss (Canadian TV series) which aired in March 2012 on the W Network. The episode is under CEO Stacey Mowbray's direction. She demonstrates her effort to inspire change from the perspective of her frontline employees, and promote Second Cup's image as a company that cares and provides the best café experience. Tassimo Second Cup beverages were launched in September 2012,  In April 2015, Second Cup launched Rewards program, which allow its users to earn points using a mobile app. 
 
Alix Box was the CEO and president at The Second Cup Ltd. from  2014 until suddenly leaving in May 2017. She was temporarily replaced by Garry MacDonald.

On April 12, 2018, Bregman announced an agreement with National Access Cannabis to develop and convert a network of recreational cannabis stores. Second Cup agreed to convert some of its western Canada locations into recreational cannabis dispensaries, with no cannabis-related products to be sold at its cafés, and  conditional on Second Cup receiving the necessary licenses from the province, as well as approval from franchisees and landlords.
. Second Cup stated that this alliance would provide an opportunity for the company to leverage its real estate assets to drive value for the franchisees, without affecting plans for new product innovation and opening new cafés across Canada.

In August 2018, the company was already considering which of its locations in Ontario might be suitable as cannabis retail stores as an alternative to their current use, in conjunction with National Access Cannabis.

Aegis Brands

On November 8, 2019, Second Cup announced plans to change its name to Aegis Brands Inc. pending stockholder approval the following year. The company was scheduled to open two cannabis stores in Calgary, in early 2020, and planned expansion into Ontario.

On December 5, 2019, Aegis Brands, Inc. announced its acquisition of Ottawa-based coffeehouse chain Bridgehead Coffee for $11 million.

In February 2021, Aegis Brands agreed to sell Second Cup to Quebec-based Foodtastic Inc. for an undisclosed sale price which included $14 million in cash. Aegis will continue to operate Bridgehead Coffee and Hemisphere Cannabis Co.  Foodtastic chief executive Peter Mammas said that the company intended to expand the brand to 300 locations by 2025, from the existing store count of 190.

Second Cup coffee

Coffee bean production
During the harvesting process, Second Cup accepts two methods of coffee cherry processing to separate the coffee bean from the cherry. The first process is called dry or unwashed. The cherries are sun dried and then milled to remove the outside layers. The resulting coffee has greater body and less acidity. The second process is called wet or washed whereby the seeds are squished out from the skin of the cherry. The seeds are then soaked in a fermentation tank to remove the outside layers. The resulting coffee is consistent and more acidic.

In the coffee roasting process, Second Cup uses batch roasting, small batches of 100–200 kg of seeds being placed in individual roasters. This method ensures greater quality control compared to other methods such as continuous roasting.

Coffee bean regions
Second Cup's coffee portfolio consists of five different categories organized by region and whether there is added flavor. The categories are called: Africa, Asia-Pacific, Latin America, Multi-Region, and Flavored. Second Cup receives coffee blends from a wide range of countries.

Panama is Central America's smallest coffee-growing country, and Second Cup's El Toucan blend is harvested from the volcanic mountain of Panama. Colombia has 12% of the world's coffee supply and is where Second Cup gets its San Agustin blend from. Second Cup's Fazenda Vista Alegre blend is from Brazil.

Rainforest Alliance
The Rainforest Alliance is an international non-profit organization that works to conserve biodiversity and promote the fair treatment of workers. Rainforest Alliance Certified coffee farms must meet standards that include the protection of farms, soils, waterways, and wildlife; the workers are in safe working conditions; and the workers enjoy good housing, medical care, and access to schools for their children. 80% of Second Cup coffees are Rainforest Alliance Certified. CEO Stacey Mowbrey's goal is to obtain environmental and fair trade certifications for every blend on Second Cup's menu. The following certifications will allow this goal to be reached.
 
As of fall 2011, Second Cup offers 10 Whole Leaf Tea Blends and Herbal Tisanes that are Fair Trade Certified. These include: Earl Grey tea, English breakfast tea, English Breakfast Decaffeinated, Green tea, Jasmine tea, Chai tea, Wildberry, Chamomile tea, Mint tea, and Holiday Blend.

Second Cup firebombing incident
In 2001, Rhéal Mathieu, a member of Front de libération du Québec (FLQ) who in 1967 had been sentenced to nine years in prison for terrorist activities including murder, was convicted of firebombing three Second Cup locations in Montreal. The responsibility for the bombings was claimed by the Brigade d'autodéfense du français (BAF) (translated as Self Defence Brigade of French). BAF claimed it had targeted the stores because of the company's use of its incorporated English name "Second Cup" demanding inclusion of French in the name of the business. After the media coverage of the fire bombings, many Second Cup locations in Quebec changed their signs to Les cafés Second Cup.

See also
 List of coffeehouse chains

References

External links

 
 MySecondCup.com (International)

Companies formerly listed on the Toronto Stock Exchange
Companies based in Mississauga
Restaurants established in 1975
Coffee brands
Coffeehouses and cafés in Canada
1975 establishments in Ontario